The 1965 Winnipeg municipal election was held on October 27, 1965 to elect mayors, councillors and school trustees in the City of Winnipeg and its suburban communities.  There were also referendums in some committees.  There was no mayoral election in Winnipeg itself.

Results

Winnipeg

Edith Tennant, D.A. Mulligan, Mark Danzker, Lloyd Stinson, William McGarva, Alan Wade, Slaw Rebchuk, Donovan Swailes and Joseph Zuken were elected to two-year terms on the Winnipeg City Council.

St. Vital

Source:  Winnipeg Free Press, 28-29 October 1965.

Municipal elections in Winnipeg
1965 in Manitoba
October 1965 events in Canada
Winnipeg